Raja Shehadeh (born 1951) is a Palestinian lawyer, human rights activist and writer. He co-founded the award-winning Palestinian human rights organization Al-Haq in 1979. In 2008, he  won the Orwell Prize, Britain's pre-eminent award for political writing, for his book Palestinian Walks.

Early life
Raja Shehadeh was born into a prominent Palestinian Christian family. His grandfather, Saleem, was a judge in the courts of the British Mandate of Palestine. His great-great-uncle, the journalist Najib Nassar, founded  the Haifa-based newspaper Al-Karmil in the last years of the Ottoman Empire, before World War I. His father, Aziz, was one of the first Palestinians to publicly support a two-state solution to the Arab-Israeli conflict. 

His family fled from Jaffa to Ramallah in 1948. In 1951, Shehadeh was born in Ramallah, West Bank, Jordan 

where he grew up. He attended  Birzeit College for two years before studying English literature in the American University of Beirut. After graduating from AUB Raja studied at the College of Law in London. Following his education, Shehadeh returned to Ramallah and went into legal practice with his father.

Legal and literary career
In 1979, Shehadeh co-founded  the human rights organization Al-Haq, which is the Palestinian affiliate of the International Commission of Jurists. 
He has written several books on international law, human rights and the Middle East.  Al-Haq was one of the first human rights organizations in the Arab world. It was a co-recipients of the Carter-Menil Human Rights Prize in 1989, and of the Geuzenpenning in 2009.

In addition to his legal work Shehadeh has written a number of books about Palestine through the lens of his life. He tells the story of his early life and his relationship with his father in  Strangers in the House. This memoir was described by The Economist as "distinctive and truly impressive". In 2008, he  won the Orwell Prize, Britain's pre-eminent award for political writing, for his book 
Palestinian Walks. 
In July 2018, his biographical Where the Line is Drawn: Crossing Boundaries in Occupied Palestine was chosen for BBC Radio 4's Book of the Week, and was narrated by actor Peter Polycarpou.

In 2016, Shehadeh took part in a project, initiated by the "Breaking the Silence" organization, to write an article for a book on the Israeli occupation, to mark the 50th anniversary of the Six-Day War. The book was edited by Michael Chabon and Ayelet Waldman, and was published under the title "Kingdom of Olives and Ash: Writers Confront the Occupation", in June 2017.

London Review of Books editor Adam Shatz cited Shehadeh as one of two people who have provided a formative influence of his understanding of the Middle East conflict, writing that 'Anguished and somewhat fragile, he is a man who, in spite of his understandable bitterness, has continued to dream of a future beyond the occupation, a kind of neo-Ottoman federation where Arabs and Jews would live as equals.'

Bibliography

 The Third Way. A Journal of Life in the West Bank. Quartet Books Ltd., 1982
 
When the Bulbul Stopped Singing (2003)
Palestinian Walks: Forays into a Vanishing Landscape (2007, 2nd edition published as Palestinian Walks: Notes on a Vanishing Landscape (2008))
A Rift In Time: Travels With My Ottoman Uncle (2010)
Occupation Diaries (2012)
Where the Line is Drawn: Crossing Boundaries in Occupied Palestine (2017)
Language of War, Language of Peace (2015)
Life Behind Israeli Checkpoints (2017)
 Going Home: A Walk Through Fifty Years of Occupation. Profile Books., 2019
 We Could Have Been Friends, My Father and I: A Palestinian Memoir, Profile Books., 2022

Book reviews

Critical studies and reviews of Shehadeh's work
Strangers in the house

References

External links

1951 births
Living people
The New York Review of Books people
Palestinian human rights activists
Palestinian journalists
20th-century Palestinian lawyers
Palestinian non-fiction writers
People from Ramallah
21st-century Palestinian lawyers